EBC may refer to:

Education 
 EBC Hochschule, a business school in Hamburg, Germany
 Escuela Bancaria y Comercial, a business school in Mexico City
 Escondido Bible College, in California, United States
 Eternity Bible College, in Simi Valley, California, United States
 Eugene Bible College, now New Hope Christian College, in Oregon, United States
 The Salvation Army Evangeline Booth College, in Atlanta, Georgia, United States

Media 
 Eagle Broadcasting Corporation, a Philippine commercial broadcaster
 Eastern Broadcasting Company, a Taiwanese television network
 Empire Broadcasting Corporation, an American radio network
 Empresa Brasil de Comunicação, a Brazilian public broadcaster
 Emu's Broadcasting Company, a British children's television programme
 Ethiopian Broadcasting Corporation, Ethiopian public broadcaster owned by government
 Ehime Broadcasting, a Japanese commercial broadcaster

Science and medicine 
 Estonian Biocentre, in Tartu, Estonia
 European Brain Council, an international health organization 
 Exhaled breath condensate
 Eyeblink conditioning

Technology 
 EFI Byte Code, a format for writing CPU-independent UEFI device drivers
 Electronic beam curing
Entity-boundary-control, an architectural pattern in the domain of software engineering

Other uses 
 Belize Elections and Boundaries Commission
 English Benedictine Congregation
 Entertainer's Basketball Classic, an American basketball tournament
 Eugene Ballet, in Oregon, United States
 European Brewery Convention, an industry organization
 Evangelical Baptist Convention, an Indian Christian denomination
 Everest Base Camp
 Exchange Bank of Canada, a Canadian commercial bank